Rohan Bopanna and Matthew Ebden defeated Constant Lestienne and Botic van de Zandschulp in the final, 6–7(5–7), 6–4, [10–6] to win the doubles tennis title at the 2023 ATP Qatar Open.

Wesley Koolhof and Neal Skupski were the reigning champions, but chose not to participate this year.

Seeds

Draw

Draw

References

External links
Main draw

Qatar ExxonMobil Open - Doubles
Qatar Open (tennis)